ʿAbd-Al-Razzāq B. ʿAlī B. Al-Hosayn Lāhījī (died c. 1072 AH [1662 CE]) was an Iranian theologian, poet and philosopher.  His mentor in philosophy was his father-in-law Mulla Sadra.

Life
Hailing from Lahijan in Gilan, he spent most of his life in Qom.  Abd al—Razzaq was a son-in-law of Mulla Sadra along with Molla Mohsen Feyz Kashani.  His son Hasan would become another prominent theologian and philosopher of the Safavid dynasty. Seyyed Hossein Nasr knows him among the intellectual figures in Persia.  Abd al—Razzaq was in agreement with Molla Sadra as to the contrast between primacy of quiddity and primacy of existence.

Works
Gawhar-e morād (Tehran, 1271 AH), a detailed exposition of his theology
Sarmāya-ye īmān
Dīvān, a volume of his poetry
Tašrīqāt, three treatises on divine unity, justice and love

Teaching and pupils
According to Madlung, Abd-Razzaq taught at the Masumieh madrasah.  There his prominent pupils included his sons Hasan and Ebrahim as well as Qazi Saeed Qommi.

Philosophy
Lāhīǰī stands at the end of a transition in Islamic scholastic theology in which the thought system of kalam was gradually replaced by that of falsafa, heavily influenced by the school of Avicenna. Lahiji in fact developed a form of Kalam which is hardly distinguishable from Hikmat, although at least in his better known works such as the "Gawhar-e morād" he does not follow the main doctrinal teachings of Mulla Sadra, as on the unity of Being and the catharsis of the faculty of imagination.

References

17th-century Persian-language poets
Islamic philosophers
Iranian Sufis
17th-century Iranian philosophers
People from Lahijan
17th-century writers of Safavid Iran
Safavid theologians